Naeem "Nomi" Qamar (born in Lahore, Pakistan) is a Pakistani male model and retired athlete.  He was a member of Pakistan's national baseball and athletics teams.  At the age of 20, he started modelling. Since then, he has modelled for various Pakistani and International brands and was nominated for "Best Male Model of Year" in 2002.  He has his own company, NQC.

References

Pakistani baseball players
People from Lahore
Pakistani male models
Living people
Year of birth missing (living people)